Descartes was a wooden-hulled paddle frigate of the French Navy. Laid down as Gomer, she was renamed Descartes in 1841 while still on the stocks.

Characteristics 
The 540 hp engines of Descartes were made by Fijenoord.

Service 

She took part in the Crimean War, and was used to ferry wounded from Italy.

On 17 October 1855, she took part in the Battle of Kinburn.

She was eventually broken up in Brest in July 1867.

References

External links 
 Nos Photographies rares 
 Plans of the Descartes

Frigates of France
Ships built in France
Frigates of the French Navy
1844 ships